Thrissilery  is a village in Wayanad district in the state of Kerala, India.

Demographics
 India census, Thrissilery had a population of 15731 with 7778 males and 7953 females.

Transportation
Thrissilery can be accessed from Mananthavady or Kalpetta. The Periya ghat road connects Mananthavady to Kannur and Thalassery.  The Thamarassery mountain road connects Calicut with Kalpetta. The Kuttiady mountain road connects Vatakara with Kalpetta and Mananthavady. The Palchuram mountain road connects Kannur and Iritty with Mananthavady.  The road from Nilambur to Ooty is also connected to Wayanad through the village of Meppadi.

The nearest railway station is at Mysore and the nearest airports are Kozhikode International Airport-120 km, Bengaluru International Airport-290 km, and   Kannur International Airport, 58 km.

See also 
 Mananthavady 
 Thondernad
 Vellamunda
 Nalloornad
Payyampally
Thavinjal
Vimalanager
Anjukunnu
Panamaram
Tharuvana
Kallody
Oorpally
Valat

Image gallery

References

Villages in Wayanad district
Mananthavady Area